Betini may refer to:

Betini, Narayani, Nepal
Betini, Sagarmatha, Nepal